Chong Kal District is a district in Oddar Meancheay province in northern Cambodia. According to the 1998 census of Cambodia, it had a population of 18,843.

Administration 
The following table shows the villages of Chong Kal district by commune.

References

Districts of Oddar Meanchey province